The Cathedral of the Assumption is a Catholic cathedral in Louisville, Kentucky, and the mother church of the Archdiocese of Louisville. It is the seat of Archbishop Shelton J. Fabre, and Martin A. Linebach, vicar general for the archdiocese, serves as rector.

History

St. Louis Church 

In 1811, a small group of Catholics in Louisville formed Saint Louis Church at 10th and Main Streets. Previously, Fr Stephen Badin, the first priest ordained in the United States, called the "circuit rider priest," had served the Louisville area, along with much of the American frontier.

In September 1821, Father Philip Hosten became the first residential pastor of Saint Louis Church. Fr. Hosten died one year later during an outbreak of yellow fever in the city. By 1830, a larger Saint Louis Church was built five blocks south of the Ohio River on Fifth Street. The Cathedral of the Assumption stands on that site to this day.

From Bardstown to Louisville 

The Diocese of Bardstown, the first inland diocese in the United States, was established in 1808, with Benedict Joseph Flaget as the first Bishop of Bardstown. The diocese included most of Kentucky, Tennessee, Missouri, Illinois, Indiana, Ohio and Michigan.

In 1841, the diocese was moved from Bardstown to Louisville, and Saint Louis Church became Saint Louis Cathedral. Bishop Flaget, now the Bishop of Louisville, decided in 1849 that a new cathedral should be built. However, Bishop Flaget died on February 11, 1850, a few months after the laying of the cornerstone for the new church building. His remains rest today in a chapel in the cathedral undercroft.

The project begun by Bishop Flaget was completed by Bishop Martin John Spalding, the second Bishop of Louisville. On October 3, 1852, the new cathedral was dedicated to the Blessed Virgin Mary under the title of the Cathedral of the Assumption. The new cathedral was almost an identical but larger replica of its predecessor, St. Louis Church. The new cathedral was built around St. Louis Church which, when the cathedral was completed, was disassembled and carried piece by piece out the front doors.

The Diocese of Louisville was elevated in 1937 to become the Archdiocese of Louisville and the metropolitan province for all the dioceses in Kentucky and Tennessee.

Bloody Monday 

The newly built Cathedral of the Assumption was nearly destroyed soon after its building due to anti-Catholic and anti-immigrant bigotry in the city of Louisville. On Monday, August 6, 1856, George D. Prentice, editor of the Louisville Journal, placed an article of his own opinion in the paper that speculated the possibility of takeover by immigrants: German and Irish. This also included accusations of vote tampering. Fearing for their safety, the "Know Nothing Party" of Nativists bombarded and ambushed local immigrant workers with ammunition, in total killing 22 German and Irish immigrants across the city. Also, the cathedral and the newly built St. Martin of Tours (completed in 1854) were believed to house weaponry in their basements. They were threatened to be burned, but the mayor of the city at the time, John Barbee, himself a "Know-Nothing," inspected the churches and cleared them of such accusations.

Renovation and revitalization 

With the 1982 arrival of Thomas C. Kelly, the third Archbishop of Louisville, the Cathedral of the Assumption began anew as an archdiocesan center, under the pastoral direction of Archbishop and Rev. J. Ronald Knott, pastor from 1983 to 1997.

In 1985, the establishment of the Cathedral Heritage Foundation (now known as the Center for Interfaith Relations) began a push for renovation of existing facilities, expansion of the cathedral complex, and revitalization of the cathedral's mission to the broader community as a spiritual center in Louisville. Together, the cathedral parish and the Cathedral Heritage Foundation brought the cathedral into the new millennium.

Renovation began in 1988 with the removal of sections of the cathedral spire, along with the finial and cross. The year 1989 saw a comprehensive restoration plan adopted. In June 1991, after one hundred years of disuse, the completely restored cathedral undercroft was reopened. Finally, in February 1993, renovation on the main cathedral space began and continued for nearly two years. The grand reopening of the cathedral was celebrated in 1994, with a completely renovated cathedral space.

In May 1994, Archbishop Kelly moved into the cathedral rectory, making him the first bishop to live in Downtown Louisville in one hundred twenty years. In June 1998, the cathedral spire and bell tower were completely renovated.

In May 2005, the first phase of renovations began on the cathedral school building, which now houses the cathedral parish office. Phase one renovations will provide more space for the parish offices while phase two will provide renovated, state-of-the-art practice space for the cathedrals renowned choirs.

The cathedral complex now houses the main cathedral building, with a Eucharistic chapel to the rear, as well as the cathedral undercroft and St. Louis Hall, the Sandefur Dining Room for the homeless, the Patterson Education Center, the cathedral school building (housing the parish offices), and the rectory, providing housing for the Archbishop and other cathedral staff.

Building 

During the renovation of the cathedral by the Conrad Schmitt Studios, the walls were faux finished to resemble stone blocks. The effect is convincing enough that many visitors to the cathedral are astonished to learn that the walls are not actual stone. In addition, much of the architectural work around the Coronation Window is a faux finish.

The stained glass that formerly stood in the side windows was removed to allow the congregation to view the surrounding buildings, in order to facilitate a sense of attachment to the community. The panels are now displayed in the front windows of the cathedral's Patterson Education Center.

The nave 

The nave, the body of the church, accommodates nine hundred sixty-six people for daily Masses and other ceremonies. The nave has no pews, utilizing individual, movable chairs, complete with kneelers. Usually arranged in straight rows facing the altar and allowing for a center aisle and two side aisles, the chairs may also be placed in rows the length of the church, facing each other across the center aisle for special services such as those of Holy Thursday, Good Friday, and the Easter Vigil. It may also be noted that during the renovations by Conrad-Schmitt, the entire building was cracked down the middle and deeply in danger of collapse. To resolve this, steel strand beams were mounted from wall to wall in the nave to provide a counter push and pull action, keeping the building from falling in or out.

The baptistry 

The baptistry holds a prominent position in the church because through it one gains entrance into the Church. A person being baptized may choose either immersion in the pool or infusion, pouring of water from the font. The old baptismal font was relocated to the rear of the nave, immediately inside the entrance doors, and an immersion pool, crafted of red granite, bronze, and marble from the original Communion rail, was added in the last renovation.

The altar 

The altar, the center of worship in the church, incorporates a base of gray marble and a red granite table like the granite of the Baptismal pool. The gray marble was taken from the original high altar, which was removed from the back of the sanctuary in the renovation following Vatican II.

The brass Lamb of God, in Latin Agnus Dei, is a symbol of Jesus, the Paschal sacrifice offered on this altar. The gray marble base of the altar has carved on the right side an open book and several keys, on the left a bishop's mitre and crozier. The book represents God's word found in the Holy Scripture, the foundation of the bishop's teaching. The keys remind us of Christ's words to Peter, "I will give you the keys of the Kingdom of Heaven" (Matthew 16:19). The shape of the crozier recalls its origin as a shepherd's crook, or staff, suggesting the bishop's pastoral role, "Feed my lambs. Tend my sheep" (John 21:15–17).

The Coronation Window 

The colorful Coronation Window illustrates the cathedral's special dedication to the Virgin Mary, the Mother of Jesus, under the title of the "Cathedral of the Assumption".

The window, designed and installed by the Blum Art Company of Louisville in 1883, depicts the crowning of the Virgin Mary as Queen of Heaven. It is one of the oldest American-made stained glass windows. This window, in the early half of the 20th century, had been moved to the front of the tower, with a new Assumption window replacing it. During restoration, the windows were switched to place the Coronation Window in its original place in the sanctuary. It was in this crane-operated delicate process that the building was cracked, temporarily halting all work. Conrad Schmitt Studios conserved the historic glass and restored the original appearance of the windows by painting the missing artwork on 2mm slide glass and sandwiching them to the conserved glass before re-leading.

According to Catholic doctrine, after the Virgin Mary died, Jesus assumed her body into heaven. As the first among the faithful, she is a sign of the eternal goal toward which all the faithful advance. Centuries of Christian artists honored Mary's preeminence by depicting her being crowned as Queen of Heaven.

The ceiling fresco 

The Ceiling Fresco depicts cherubs surrounding the Virgin Mary at the time of her assumption into Heaven.

According to the Historic Structure Report of 1986, a Mr. Landrop, or Gandrop, of Cincinnati painted the fresco. The fresco remained until 1964, through many different changes to the interior. At that time, it was painted over after some plaster fell and was patched. It was rediscovered when again plaster fell from the ceiling, revealing the jewel that lay beneath. The fresco has been painstakingly restored to its earlier beauty.

The cathedra 

The cathedra, behind the altar, is the official chair of the Archbishop. It is an ancient symbol of the tradition and authority of the bishop in the life of the Church. The cathedra represents his three main offices of teaching, sanctifying and governing.

A cathedral houses the official chair of the bishop of the diocese. In Latin, the word chair is cathedra, from which the name cathedral is derived. The cathedra, upholstered in red suede, has painted on its back the coat of arms of the Archdiocese of Louisville.

Symbols on the coat of arms, important to Louisville and the Archdiocese, include:

 The fleur de lis, representing Louisville's French heritage
 A crozier
 A Star of David, an early symbol of the Virgin Mary
 A stockade and water flowing downward, representing Fort Nelson and the Ohio River
 Arrowheads representing the native peoples in this area

The presider's chair was purchased from a local antique store because of its similarity in design to the cathedra. From here, the priest presides during the Mass.

The organ 

Above the entrance are the choir loft and the magnificent pipe organ built by Steiner-Reck, Inc., of Louisville in 1983. The organ features three manuals and forty-three ranks. Fanfare trumpets were added in 1994, along with both 32-foot ranks, full MIDI capability, and a Gothic casework of hand-carved mahogany. The center section of the loft railing is original, featuring small pointed arches with a reproduction of the design on the side sections.

The ambo 

The Ambo, or pulpit, incorporates gray marble and red granite. Here the scriptures are proclaimed, the responsorial psalm is sung, and the homilist addresses the congregation.

Role in the community 

Like European cathedrals, the Cathedral of the Assumption has tried to respond to the needs of the community, serving as a hospice, an orphanage, and a shelter for the poor. Presentation Academy, Saint Joseph Infirmary, and Saint Vincent's Orphanage each grew out of the cathedral undercroft. This tradition continues at the Cathedral of the Assumption, with many programs reaching out to the social and spiritual concerns of the community, including:

 A Daily Lunch Program which serves approximately 125 homeless individuals
 Dress for Success: A not-for-profit organization that helps low-income women transition into the workforce, providing resources and training on clothing, grooming, and professionalism
 The Healing Place: Provides overnight shelter for the homeless, substance abuse programs for men and women, health care, meals, a clothes closet, and other services; provides care for mothers and their children who have fled abusive homes
 Housing Initiative: volunteers for Repair Affair, Project Warm, Habitat for Humanity, and similar projects
 Hunger and Poverty: involved in the AIDS Walk, Hunger Walk, the annual "Desserts Desserts" Festival, and special homeless dinners, particularly at Thanksgiving and Christmas.

The Center for Interfaith Relations 

Founded in 1985 as the Cathedral Heritage Foundation, the foundation changed its name to the Center for Interfaith Relations in 2006 after achieving its three original goals. The primary mission was to undertake the restoration of the cathedral. Twenty years later, it continues to provide community outreach, fulfilling a portion of the mission of the cathedral. Development of spiritual, educational, and cultural experiences is CIR's continuing mission, with the goal of inspiring and fostering individual growth. In an expression of the cathedral's commitment to ecumenism, CIR serves to increase understanding among diverse cultures and to advance ecumenical understanding.

Music at the cathedral 

The cathedral choirs have made three European tours, most recently in 2004 touring England and Ireland, singing at Killarney Cathedral, Gloucester Cathedral, and St. Martin-in-the-Fields under the direction of Dr. Phillip Brisson, DMA (Eastman School of Music, 2005), Director of Music for the cathedral. The choirs have recorded two compact disks, and a third disk of their most recent international tour repertoire is in the planning stage. The cathedral choirs have also performed many times with the Louisville Orchestra.

The cathedral choir is a mixed choir of approximately forty-five voices and is completely composed of volunteer amateurs, with the exception of four paid section leaders. The Cathedral Choir of Trebles and Mixed Voices consists of approximately seven girls and boys ranging in ages from twelve to seventeen, three adult women and six adult men. The two choirs of the cathedral, though rehearsing separately, sing the same literature for both Sunday morning Masses. Their repertoire includes examples of the great choral literature from early chant through the Renaissance, Baroque, Classical, Romantic, and 20th-century periods. They also come together for special projects, including the Masses of Holy Week and their acclaimed international tours.

The cathedral also boasts many talented semiprofessional cantors who share their gifts with the cathedral community for weekend and Holy Day Masses. There is also a dedicated corps of weekday cantors who offer their services for each of the five weekday noon Masses.

Additionally, the clock/bell tower is home to numerous Petit and Fritsen tuned bells from the Netherlands and is one of the few carillons in Kentucky. Smith's Bell and Clock Service from Mooresville, Indiana, is responsible for taking care of the bells and is currently renovating one of the clock face time pieces. Rappelling via a harness and pulley system was necessary to take the hands down and repair the clock movement. Other repairs and building renovation are currently in progress.

Covenant Community 

The Cathedral of the Assumption welcomes members of Christ Church Episcopal Cathedral to visit the cathedral, and the two cathedrals have formed a covenant relationship. An annual Lenten Vespers is held by the covenant cathedrals. The highlight of the covenant relationship is the joint Service of Light held on Holy Saturday. The congregations of both cathedrals meet between the two churches and jointly bless the new fire used to light the Paschal candle. From there, each congregation processes to their respective cathedral.

Sister parish 

In November 2000, the Cathedral of the Assumption and St. Louis Parish (Jeremie, Haiti) formed a sister parish relationship. The exchange of gifts, talents, and spirituality is the goal of the sister parish relationship. Awareness and communication between the Cathedral of the Assumption and St. Louis Parish is maintained by the Sister Parish Committee.

See also 

 Basilica of St. Joseph Proto-Cathedral
List of Catholic cathedrals in the United States
List of cathedrals in the United States
 List of attractions and events in the Louisville metropolitan area
 National Register of Historic Places listings in Downtown Louisville, Kentucky
 Religion in Louisville, Kentucky

References

External links 

 

Cathedral of the Assumption
Roman Catholic churches in Louisville, Kentucky
Roman Catholic Archdiocese of Louisville
Roman Catholic cathedrals in Kentucky
Cathedral of the Assumption
Cathedral of the Assumption
Cathedral of the Assumption
Churches on the National Register of Historic Places in Kentucky
Roman Catholic churches completed in 1852
1852 establishments in Kentucky
19th-century Roman Catholic church buildings in the United States
Gothic Revival church buildings in Kentucky